Tan Hiep Phat Beverage Group is a Vietnamese drink producer. The company was founded by Tran Qui Thanh in 1994. It is the largest privately-owned soft drink provider in Vietnam, and produces over a billion litres a year.

The company operates in Vietnam and 16 additional countries including Australia and China.

History
Tran Qui Thanh set up the company in 1994, the year that the United States ended its trade embargo with Vietnam. 

Tran started as a beer company, and was known as Ben Thanh Brewery and Beverage factory. Tran bought an old production line from Saigon Beer and fixed up the factory. He moved his family into the building, and raised his children on the premises. 

The company then changed to bottled teas and later expanded to energy drinks as well, beginning sales of their green tea in 2006 and herbal tea in 2009.

In 2011 Coca-Cola offered to buy the company, valuing it at $2.5 billion. The company ultimately turned down the offer, as Coca-Cola did not want the company to expand outside Vietnam which was counter to Tran's intentions.

2015 lawsuit
In 2015 a customer claimed he had found a fly inside one of their bottles. The case led to Tan Hiep Phat receiving harsh criticism in the media. However, the company eventually won the case in court, which found the consumer's claims to be false. 

Tran has said that the incident damaged the company's public image, and that in order to repair his image he began offering public visits to the company's factory in order to restore faith in their products.

References

1994 establishments in Vietnam
Drink companies of Vietnam